Galloping Dynamite is a 1936 American Western film directed by Harry L. Fraser and written by Sherman L. Lowe, Charles R. Condon, Stanley Roberts and Jesse Duffy. The film stars Kermit Maynard, Ariane Allen, John Merton, David Sharpe, Stanley Blystone, John Ward and Earl Dwire. The film was released on July 12, 1937, by Ambassador Pictures.

Plot
Jim Dillon's brother Bob has been killed by Reed after finding gold, Reed fails to kill Jim as he investigates his brother's death, but Reed blames the murder on Jim and he is condemned to be hung.

Cast           
Kermit Maynard as Jim Dillon
Ariane Allen as Jane Foster
John Merton as Reed
David Sharpe as Bob Dillon 
Stanley Blystone as Lew Wilkes
John Ward as Sam Jenkins
Earl Dwire as Pop 
Bob Burns as Sheriff
Budd Buster as Mike 
Tracy Layne as Mosby

References

External links
 

1937 films
1930s English-language films
American Western (genre) films
1937 Western (genre) films
Films directed by Harry L. Fraser
Films based on works by James Oliver Curwood
American black-and-white films
1930s American films